Moritz Müller (born 19 November 1986) is a German professional ice hockey defenceman. He is currently playing as Captain for Kölner Haie in the Deutsche Eishockey Liga (DEL).

International career
He represented Germany at the 2018 IIHF World Championship and won silver.

Career statistics

Regular season and playoffs

International

References

External links
 

1986 births
Living people
Essen Mosquitoes players
German ice hockey defencemen
Ice hockey players at the 2018 Winter Olympics
Kassel Huskies players
Kölner Haie players
Medalists at the 2018 Winter Olympics
Olympic ice hockey players of Germany
Olympic medalists in ice hockey
Olympic silver medalists for Germany
Sportspeople from Frankfurt
Ice hockey players at the 2022 Winter Olympics